Saint Joseph Catholic School (also known as St. Joe) is a Catholic high school located in Madison, Mississippi. The school was founded by the Sisters of Mercy in 1870.

History
1870 - 1965: St. Joseph Catholic School, founded by the Sisters of Mercy in 1870, was located at Amite Street from 1870 until 1965.

1965 - 1998: In 1965, the school relocated to Boling Street where it remained until 1996. It had a two-year temporary home at Holly Drive, adjacent to St. Richard Catholic Church.

1998: St. Joseph School moved to its present location on New Mannsdale Road, near the intersection of Highway 463 and I-55 in Madison.

Accreditation and Membership
 St. Joseph Catholic School is accredited by the Southern Association of Colleges and Schools.
 St. Joseph Catholic School is a member of the National Catholic Education Association and the Mississippi High School Activities Association.

Academics
Note: **Must Have Guidance Approval  *Summer School Option
Curriculum - Middle School

Curriculum - High School

Graduation Requirements
In order to graduate from St. Joseph Catholic School, each student must
complete a minimum number of Carnegie units.(28 Carnegie Units)
4 units of Religion (9, 10, 11, 12; required each year student is enrolled at St. Joe)
4 units of English (9, 10, 11, 12)
4 units of Mathematics (9, 10, 11, 12)
4 units of Science (9, 10, 11, 12)
4 units of Social Studies (9, 10, 11, 12)
2 units of Foreign Language
1 unit of Fine Arts
½ unit of Public Speaking
½ unit of Computer applications
½ unit of Comprehensive Health
½  unit of Personal Finance
½ unit of Physical Education
Demonstrate Keyboarding proficiency

The remaining  units are Electives. Electives and required courses must add to graduation requirements listed above. Students are expected to carry seven (7) units each year. Students must pass ALL classes each year or attend a recognized summer program. School transcripts include ALL grades, attendance and standardized test scores. Service Requirement of 25 hours are required each year of high school. Yearly attendance at grade level retreats is also required.

Religion Classes 
Grade 7 - Salvation History Sacraments; signs of Christ's continuing presence
Grade 8 - The growth of Christianity The commandments/morality
Grade 9 - Understanding Catholic Christianity and Hebrew Scripture
Grade 10 - New Testament & Christology
Grade 11 - A History of the Catholic Church and Christian Justice
Grade 12 - World Religions and Christian Lifestyles

Masses
School masses are celebrated on campus on a regular basis by the Catholic priests of the Jackson-Metro Area.

Notable alumni
John Bond, high school football coach
Micah Pellerin, former NFL player

See also
List of private schools in Mississippi

References

External links
St. Joseph Catholic School

Educational institutions established in 1870
Private middle schools in Mississippi
Roman Catholic Diocese of Jackson
Catholic secondary schools in Mississippi
Schools in Madison County, Mississippi
1870 establishments in Mississippi
Private schools in the Jackson metropolitan area, Mississippi